Cleopatra was a "cylinder ship" built to take Cleopatra's Needle from Alexandria to London in 1877.

The obelisk weighed more than 200 tons. It was encased in a cylindrical iron pontoon which was then rolled by means of levers and chains down a track into the sea. The pontoon was fitted with a deck-house, mast, rudder and steering gear and was crewed by Maltese sailors. The pontoon was towed to Great Britain by the steamship Olga leaving on 21 September 1877. Captain Henry Carter supervised Cleopatras building and became her commander. Captain Booth commanded Olga.

On 14 October 1877 the Cleopatra was in danger of sinking off France in the Bay of Biscay. The steam-ship towing her, the Olga, sent six volunteers in a boat to take off the Cleopatras crew, but the boat swamped and the volunteers drowned. Eventually the Olga managed to draw alongside and rescue Cleopatras crew of five and skipper, they cut the towrope, and left the vessel adrift in the Bay. Five days later a ship spotted the ‘Cleopatra’ floating undamaged off the northern coast of Spain, and she was towed to the Ferrol, Galicia. There a steam-ship, the Anglia, arrived to tow her to London. They arrived at Gravesend on 21 January 1878. Cleopatra was broken up immediately after the obelisk had been removed on 6 July 1878. The needle was installed on the Thames Embankment in September 1878, where it still stands.

Design
It was supplemented by a bow and a vertical stern, rudder, two sidewalls, and a mast for sails to stabilise the vessel. A bridge was built to accommodate the crew.

Designed as a pontoon, and commanded by Captain Carter, she was to be towed to London by the ship Olga, commanded by Captain Booth.

The cylindrical shape was a clever choice in the context of a constrained budget (private funding by some patrons). Indeed, the cylinder, made of sheet metal riveted curves was literally built around the obelisk, with circular internal partitions used as cradles for the monolith.

Both ends were topped with a crown of planks, the cylinder could ride on the Nile, with minimal effort, using cables driven by winches. Unfortunately, at the time of launching, a concealed rock in the mud punctured the cylinder which then blocked the waterway.

After towing to a dry-dock of the Egyptian Admiralty, the cylinder was turned into a ship by adding an internal ballast made of rails, a bow and a stern with rudder and a roof to shelter the crew. It carried a single mast rigged with gaff and foresail. 

Once completed, the ship looked like a primitive submarine, but its seagoing capabilities were more limited and in retrospect, the choice of crossing the Bay of Biscay in the autumn was a risky choice.

See also
 Cleopatra's Needle (London), moving it
 , the ship used to take the other Cleopatra's Needle to New York
 Cleopatra's Needle (New York)

Notes

References
 
 
 
 
 

1877 ships
Ships of Egypt
Ships of the United Kingdom
Maritime incidents in October 1877